The University of Miami (UM, UMiami, Miami, U of M, and The U) is a private research university in Coral Gables, Florida. , the university enrolled 19,096 students in 12 colleges and schools across nearly 350 academic majors and programs, including the Leonard M. Miller School of Medicine in Miami's Health District, the law school on the main campus, and the Rosenstiel School of Marine and Atmospheric Science on Virginia Key with research facilities in southern Miami-Dade County.

The University of Miami offers 138 undergraduate, 140 master's, and 67 doctoral degree programs. Since its founding in 1925, the university has attracted students from all 50 states and 173 foreign countries. With 16,954 faculty and staff as of 2021, the University of Miami is the second-largest employer in Miami-Dade County.

University of Miami faculty include a number of notable academics across nearly all disciplines, including four Nobel Prize recipients. The university is classified among "Doctoral Universities: Very High Research Activity". As of 2021, it is the 71st-largest research university in the nation with research expenditures of $375 million. Its undergraduate academic admissions standards are ranked the most selective among all of Florida's 171 universities and colleges, and the university's library system ranks among the top 50 research libraries in North America with over four million volumes, including exceptional holdings in Cuban heritage and music. 

As of 2021, the University of Miami has 218,817 total alumni since its 1925 founding, including several globally notable alumni who have gone on to prove enormously influential in a wide range of fields, including academics, business, government, scientific innovation and healthcare, non-profit organizational leadership, thought leadership and activism, television and film, music, professional and Olympic athletics, art, literature, and writing.

The University of Miami's intercollegiate athletic teams are collectively known as the Miami Hurricanes and compete in Division I of the National Collegiate Athletic Association. Its football team has won five national championships since 1983 and its baseball team has won four national championships since 1982.

History

Leadership

Bowman Foster Ashe (1926 to 1952)

In 1925, the University of Miami was founded by a group of citizens who sought to offer "unique opportunities to develop inter-American studies, further creative work in the arts and letters, and conduct teaching and research programs in tropical studies", according to the university's founding charter. They believed that a local university would benefit the Miami metropolitan area and were optimistic that the university would be a beneficiary of future financial support, especially since South Florida was benefiting from the historic 1920s land boom. During this era of Jim Crow laws, there were three large state-funded universities in Florida for white males, white females, and black coeds: the University of Florida in Gainesville and Florida State University and Florida A&M University, both in Tallahassee). Like most private universities of the time, the University of Miami was founded as a coeducational institution but not yet open to Black students.

The university began in earnest in 1925 when George E. Merrick, founder of Coral Gables, granted  and nearly $5 million ($ million, adjusted for current inflation) for the university's founding. The contributions included land contracts and mortgages on real estate that had been sold in the city. The university was formally chartered April 8, 1925 by the Circuit Court for Dade County. But by 1926, as the first class of 372 students enrolled at the new university, the land boom had collapsed and hopes for a speedy recovery were dashed by the Great Miami Hurricane of 1926. For the next 15 years, the university struggled financially, bordering on insolvency. The first building on campus, now known as the Merrick Building, was left half built for over two decades due to the economic difficulties, requiring that classes be held off-campus at the nearby Anastasia Hotel in Coral Gables. Partitions separated the classrooms, giving the university the early but long since discarded nickname Cardboard College.

In 1929, University of Miami founding member William E. Walsh and other members of the university's board of regents resigned following the widespread collapse of Florida's economy. The university's plight was so severe that students went door to door in Coral Gables collecting funds to keep it open. A reconstituted ten-member board was chaired by the university's first president Bowman Foster Ashe (1926–1952) and included Merrick, Joseph H. Adams, Theodore Dickinson, E.B. Douglas, David Fairchild, James H. Gilman, J. C. Penney, Richardson Saunders, and Frank B. Shutts. In 1930, several faculty members and more than 60 students entered the University of Miami when the University of Havana closed amidst political unrest in Cuba. But none of it proved enough, and the university was forced to seek bankruptcy protection in 1932.

The troubles, however, were short-lived. In July 1934, the University of Miami was reincorporated and a board of trustees was installed, replacing the board of regents. By 1940, community leaders were replacing faculty and administration as trustees. During Ashe's presidency, the university grew considerably, adding the School of Law (1928), the School of Business (1929, renamed the Miami Herbert Business School in 2019), the School of Education (1929), the Graduate School (1941), the Marine Laboratory (1943, renamed the Rosenstiel School in 1969), the School of Engineering (1947), and the School of Medicine (1952).

During World War II, the University of Miami was one of only 131 colleges and universities nationally to participate in the V-12 Navy College Training Program, which offered students a path to commissioning as a U.S. Navy officer.

Jay F. W. Pearson (1952 until 1962)

In 1952, Jay F. W. Pearson, one of Ashe's long-time assistants, was appointed the University of Miami's second president. A charter faculty member and marine biologist, Pearson held the university's presidency for a decade, until 1962. Under Pearson's leadership, the University of Miami began awarding its first Ph.D. degrees, and student enrollment increased substantially, exceeding 4,000.

From 1961 until 1968, the university leased buildings on its south campus to the Central Intelligence Agency that were used in the JMWAVE operation against Fidel Castro's government in Cuba. The university no longer owns land at the south campus.

In 1961, the university dropped its policy of racial segregation and began admitting Black students and allowing their full participation in student activities and athletic teams. Five years later, in 1966, Ray Bellamy, a Black student at the University of Miami, became the first major Black college athlete in the Deep South to receive an athletic scholarship.

Until the early 1970s, as was widespread practice at colleges and universities nationally, the university regulated female student conduct more strictly than that of male students, including employing a staff under the Dean of Women charged with watching over female students. Under Pearson, however, the university began incrementally liberalizing these policies. In 1971, he consolidated the separate Dean of Men and Dean of Women positions in one. The same year, the university established a Women's Commission, which issued a 1974 report on the status of women on campus, leading to the university's first female commencement speaker, day care, and the launch of a Women's Study minor. Following enactment of Title IX in 1972 and over a decade of litigation, University of Miami organizations, including honorary societies, were opened to women's participation and inclusion. The Women's Commission also secured more equitable funding for women's sports. In 1973, Terry Williams Munz became the first woman in the nation awarded an athletic scholarship when she accepted a University of Miami golf scholarship.

Henry King Stanford (1962 until 1981)

Henry King Stanford, then president of Birmingham–Southern College, was appointed the University of Miami's third president in 1962. Stanford led an increased emphasis on the university's research, reorganization of its administrative structure, and construction of new campus facilities. New research centers established under Stanford included the Center for Advanced International Studies (1964), the Institute of Molecular and Cellular Evolution (1964), the Center for Theoretical Studies (1965), and the Institute for the Study of Aging (1975). In 1965, the University of Miami also began actively recruiting international students. Beginning with the 1968 football season, Stanford barred playing of "Dixie" by the university's band.

Edward T. Foote II (1981 until 2000)

In 1981, Edward T. Foote II, then dean of Washington University School of Law, was appointed the University of Miami's fourth president. Under Foote's leadership, the university continued and accelerated its objective of attracting elite faculty and students. As part of the university's strategic plan under Foote's leadership, the university consciously limited and even reduced the number of its undergraduates with a conscientious focus on quality alone. He also led a successful effort to convert on-campus student housing into a system of residential colleges and the university launched its largest fundraising campaign to date, a five-year, $400 million campaign that began in 1984 and ultimately substantially exceeded that goal, raising $517.5 million, and the University of Miami began being cited as one of the nation's premier universities. Under Foote, the University of Miami's endowment expanded almost ten-fold from $47.4 million in 1981 to $465.2 million in 2000.

Donna Shalala (2000 until 2015)

Foote was succeeded by Donna Shalala, former chancellor of the University of Wisconsin–Madison from 1988 to 1993 and U.S. Secretary of Health and Human Services from 1993 to 2001. Shalala was named the University of Miami's fifth president in November 2000. Under Shalala, the University of Miami built new libraries, dormitories, symphony rehearsal halls, and classroom buildings. The university's academic quality also continued improving, a trend that began in earnest under Foote.

Roughly a year into Shalala's presidency, on November 5, 2001, an 18-year-old University of Miami fraternity pledge drowned while attempting to swim across Lake Osceola, the campus lake, while intoxicated. Police reports later cited the student's dangerously high blood alcohol content in conjunction with dropping water temperatures and exhaustion as primary factors in his death, and two fraternity members who accompanied him were criminally charged with "negligence, breach of fiduciary duty, and breach of duty to aid and/or rescue." The university responded by making swimming in Lake Osceola, which was already prohibited, punishable by expulsion.

In 2002, the University of Miami launched a new and even more ambitious multi-year fundraising campaign that ultimately raised $1.37 billion, the most ever raised by any university or college in Florida history . From these proceeds, over half, $854 million, was allocated to construct and improve the University of Miami's Leonard M. School of Medicine medical campus. In November 2007, the University of Miami acquired Cedars Medical Center in Miami's Health District, renaming it University of Miami Hospital and giving the Miller School of Medicine its first dedicated in-house teaching hospital rather than having to rely on academic affiliations with area hospitals.

In 2003, Shalala controversially chose to close the University of Miami's North-South Center, which was established by the U.S. Congress in 1984, had secured a partnership with the Rand Corporation, and had become, as Associated Press reported in 2003, "a respected public policy think tank specializing in Latin American and Caribbean issues including trade and economic policy, migration, security, public corruption, and the environment."

On September 30, 2004, the University of Miami hosted one of three nationally televised U.S. presidential debates between presidential candidates George W. Bush and John Kerry during the 2004 presidential election. The debate was moderated by Jim Lehrer of PBS NewsHour and held on the University of Miami campus inside the Watsco Center. It drew 62.5 million viewers.

In February 2006, University of Miami custodial workers, who had been contracted to the university through a Boston-based company, alleged unfair labor practices, substandard pay, lack of health benefits, and workplace safety concerns and began a strike. The strike drew support from several University of Miami students, who began a hunger strike and on-campus vigil in support of it. The strike settled May 1, 2006 when a card count union vote was permitted and led to establishment of the first collective bargaining unit in the university's history. The university raised wages for its custodial workers from $6.40 to $8.35 per hour and provided health insurance.

In 2008 and 2009, in part stemming from the Great Recession, the university endowment lost 26.8% of its capital and additional associated losses from diminished endowment income. The university responded by tightening expenditures. Damage from the endowment's negative performance was limited, however, because the university receives over 98 percent of its operating budget from non-endowment sources. In 2011, the university was ranked the nation's most fiscally responsible nonprofit organization in a Charity Navigator report published in collaboration with Worth magazine.

Julio Frenk (2015 until present)

On April 13, 2015, the University of Miami announced the appointment of Julio Frenk, former dean of Harvard University School of Public Health and former Secretary of Health for the government of Mexico, as the university's sixth president.

On March 10, 2016, the University of Miami hosted the 2016 Republican presidential primary's twelfth and final debate at BankUnited Center on the university campus, which was aired nationally on CNN.

Campus

Coral Gables campus

Most of the university's academic programs are based on its main Coral Gables campus, which houses seven schools and two colleges, including the Frost School of Music, Herbert Business School, and the University of Miami School of Law. Lake Osceola, a man-made freshwater lake developed in the late 1940s, is located at the center of campus.

The university's campus theater, Jerry Herman Ring Theatre, is named for University of Miami alumnus Jerry Herman, a composer and lyricist responsible for some of Broadway's most successful productions, including Hello Dolly!, La Cage aux Folles, and other Broadway hits.

The John C. Gifford Arboretum, a campus arboretum and botanical garden, is located on the northwest corner of the main Coral Gables campus. The Jorge M. Perez Architecture Center at the University of Miami's School of Architecture holds periodic architecture and design exhibitions.

Transportation to the Coral Gables campus is provided by Miami Metrorail, whose University Station stop is within walking distance of the campus. The Metro connects the University of Miami to Downtown Miami, Brickell, Coconut Grove, Civic Center, Miami International Airport, and other Miami neighborhoods. The University of Miami's Coral Gables campus is about a 15-minute train ride from Downtown and Brickell. The Hurry 'Canes shuttle bus service operates two routes on campus, including to University Station, and weekend routes to various off-campus stores and facilities during the academic year; an additional shuttle route provides service to the Rosenstiel School of Marine and Atmospheric Science campus on Virginia Key and Vizcaya Station. The university also has a Zipcar service.

In February 2018, rap artist Drake filmed substantial portions of the music video for his song "God's Plan" on the University of Miami campus.

Student housing

The University of Miami's main campus in Coral Gables houses 5,415 enrolled students, 89 percent of whom are freshman. The university's on-campus housing consists of five residential colleges and one apartment-style housing area available only to undergraduate degree-seeking students. The residential colleges are divided into two dormitory-style residence halls and three suite-style residence halls: The first, McDonald and Pentland Towers of Hecht Residential College and the Walsh and Rosborough Towers of Stanford Residential College, are commonly referred to as the "Freshman Towers". The second, Eaton Residential College, which originally housed only women, and Mahoney/Pearson Residential Colleges have suite-style housing with double-occupancy rooms connected by a shared bathroom.

In addition to these five residential colleges, the university campus includes a student residential area called University Village, which consists of seven buildings with apartment-style annual contract housing including fully furnished kitchen facilities. University Village is available only to juniors and seniors but previously had been open to graduate students and students of the School of Law until 2009. The University of Miami also has seven fraternity houses, on San Amaro Drive opposite the university's intramural fields, called "Fraternity Row". The seven fraternities, which offer housing to student members of these fraternities, include: Alpha Epsilon Pi, Alpha Sigma Phi, Lambda Chi Alpha, Pi Kappa Phi, Sigma Alpha Epsilon, Sigma Chi, and Zeta Beta Tau. Sororities are housed in on-campus suites, which do not currently serve as residences.

Lakeside Village, a residential complex of 25 interconnected buildings, provides student housing for 1,115 sophomores, juniors, and seniors. This $153 million project was completed in August 2020.

Medical school campus

The University of Miami's Leonard M. Miller School of Medicine campus, located on Northwest 10th Avenue in Miami's Health District, has 1,523 full-time faculty and 819 students as of 2022. The campus includes  within the University of Miami Jackson Memorial Medical Center's  complex.

The medical center includes three University of Miami-owned hospitals: University of Miami Hospital, Sylvester Comprehensive Cancer Center, and Anne Bates Leach Eye Hospital. Jackson Memorial Hospital, Holtz Children's Hospital, and Miami Veterans Affairs Medical Center are based on the medical center and maintain affiliations with the University of Miami but are not owned by the university. The heart of the School of Medicine campus, the original City of Miami Hospital that opened in 1918, is known colloquially as "The Alamo", and has been named to the National Register of Historic Places.

In 2007, the university purchased Cedars Medical Center and renamed it University of Miami Hospital. Situated in Miami's Health District, the hospital is close to Jackson Memorial Hospital, which is used by University of Miami medical students and faculty to provide patient care.

In 2009, a LEED-certified nine-story biomedical research building, a  laboratory, and an office facility were opened to house the University of Miami's Interdisciplinary Stem Cell Institute and its John P. Hussman Institute for Human Genomics. The University of Miami has completed a  Life Science Park adjacent to the university's medical campus that houses medical offices and laboratories. The University of Miami's medical campus is connected to the university's main campus by the Metrorail with direct stations at University Station for the main Coral Gables campus and Civic Center Station for the medical campus.

Rosenstiel School of Marine and Atmospheric Science campus

The University of Miami's Rosenstiel School of Marine and Atmospheric Science maintains its  campus on the Biscayne Bay waterfront on Virginia Key. It is the only subtropical marine and atmospheric research institute in the continental United States. The school is home to the world's largest hurricane simulation tank. The Atlantic Oceanographic and Meteorological Laboratory, a federal research laboratory, maintains its headquarters next to the Rosenstiel School campus on Rickenbacker Causeway and collaborates on various academic projects with the Rosenstiel School.

The school maintains a research facility on the eastern end of the Caribbean nation of Barbados called the Rosenstiel School's Barbados Atmospheric Chemistry Observatory (BACO). This facility provides detailed documentation and research on summertime transport of Saharan dust particles across the Atlantic Ocean to the Caribbean Basin and South America.

The school's origins date back to 1945 when construction began on Rickenbacker Causeway to make Virginia Key accessible by car. During the Causeway's construction, Miami-Dade County offered the university a part of the island adjacent to Miami Seaquarium in exchange for it agreeing to assume operational management of the aquarium. In 1951, however, the aquarium's construction was delayed following the failure of a bond referendum designed to fund it, and the university instead chose to begin leasing the land from the county. In 1953, the university built classroom and lab buildings on a  campus to house what would become the University of Miami's Rosenstiel School of Marine and Atmospheric Science (RSMAS). Additional buildings were added in 1957, 1959, and 1965. From 1947 to 1959, the State of Florida funded the University of Miami Marine Lab on Virginia Key until the state completed construction of its own marine laboratory in St. Petersburg. In 2009, the University of Miami received a $15 million federal grant to help construct a new $43.8 million,  Marine Technology and Life Sciences Seawater Research Building on the Rosenstiel School campus.

South and Richmond campuses

In 1946, following the U.S. military's deactivation of Richmond Naval Air Station in southwestern Miami, the University of Miami acquired the  facility to accommodate its vast increase in post-World War II students. The property included classrooms, housing, and other amenities capable of accommodating approximately 1,100 students. Two years later, in 1948, the property was repurposed by the University of Miami as a research facility. In the 1960s, the university opted to lease some of its buildings to the Central Intelligence Agency. Another section of the property, established in 1948, was called South Campus and included a  plot used for university-sponsored agricultural and horticultural research. For 20 years, the University of Miami used radioactive isotopes in biological research on the South Campus and buried these radioactive materials, including animals eradicated in research, on the site. In August 2006, the University of Miami agreed to reimburse the U.S. Army Corps of Engineers $393,473 for clean up costs at the site made available under the 1980 Superfund law. Six buildings on the site provide  and currently house the Global Public Health Research Group, Miami Institute for Human Genomics, and Forensic Toxicology Laboratory. The University of Miami once considered building a south campus on the property but instead opted in 2014 to sell the 80 acres of land.

The Richmond campus is a  site that was formerly the United States Naval Observatory Secondary National Time Standard Facility, which already had buildings and a 20M antenna used for long interferometry. The University of Miami's Rosenstiel School's Center for Southeastern Tropical Advanced Remote Sensing and Richmond Satellite Operations Center (RSOC) maintain their research facilities on part of this campus.

Libraries

The University of Miami maintains one of the nation's largest university library systems, which currently hold in excess of four million volumes, over four million microforms, over 1.3 million electronic books, 138,402 active serials titles, 137,723 electronic journals, and 210,000 audio, film, video, and cartographic materials as of 2022. The University of Miami's libraries have a staff of 71 librarians, 33 professional staff, and 76 support staff.

Four of the University of Miami's libraries are located on the Coral Gables campus: Otto G. Richter Library, the university's primary interdisciplinary library, and the Architecture Research Center at the School of Architecture, the Judi Prokop Newman Information Resource Center at the Herbert Business School, and the Marta and Austin Weeks Library at Frost School of Music.

The Miller School of Medicine's main library, Louis Calder Memorial Library, is located on Northwest 10th Avenue on the medical campus in the Miami Health District. The medical school also maintains and manages two specialized medical libraries: The Mary and Edward Norton Library in ophthalmology focused on ophthalmology and the Pomerance Library focused on psychiatry. The Rosenstiel School of Marine and Atmospheric Science Library is based on the Rosentiel School's campus on Virginia Key.

Otto G. Richter Library, the largest of the university's libraries on the Coral Gables campus, houses art, architecture, humanities, social sciences, and science collections. The Richter Library also serves as a depository for federal and state government publications. Rare books, maps, manuscript collections, and the University of Miami Archives are housed in the library's Special Collections Division. The Richter's Cuban Heritage Collection, which specializes in Cuba-related collections, maintains some of world's largest Cuba-related holdings.

In January 2017, the Jay I. Kislak Foundation announced it was making a substantial donation of rare books, maps, and manuscripts to the university's libraries. In preparation for the extensive donation, the University of Miami renovated a former lecture hall, now called the Kislak Center at the University of Miami, to house the works and the university's existing special collections and archives. Among the vast holdings in the university's Kislak Center are Christopher Columbus' original published copies of his letter on the first voyage aboard the Niña, which Columbus authored on February 15, 1493.

Academics

The University of Miami currently employs 2,697 full-time faculty members with 98 percent of them holding either doctorates or terminal degrees in their respective specialties. The university's student-faculty ratio, as of 2018, was 12:1.

Accreditations
The University of Miami is a broadly accredited academic institution, including by the Southern Association of Colleges and Schools and the Florida Department of Education and by 22 programmatic accrediting bodies, including the Accreditation Council for Graduate Medical Education, the American Bar Association, the American Dental Association Commission on Dental Accreditation, the American Physical Therapy Association Commission on Accreditation in Physical Therapy Education, the American Psychological Association, the Association to Advance Collegiate Schools of Business, the Commission on the Accreditation of Healthcare Management Education, the Commission on Collegiate Nursing Education, the Council on Education for Public Health, the EQUIS, the Liaison Committee on Medical Education, the National Association of Schools of Music, and the Society for Simulation in Healthcare.

The university is a member of the American Association of University Women, the American Council on Education, the American Council of Learned Societies, the Association of American Colleges and Universities, the Florida Association of Colleges and Universities, the Independent Colleges and Universities of Florida, and the National Association of Independent Colleges and Universities.

In September 2022, Miami Herbert Business School was awarded AMBA accreditation, securing "triple crown" accreditation status, which includes accreditation by EQUIS, AACSB International, and AMBA. Less than one percent of the world's business schools have been recognized with accreditation from all three of these academic accrediting bodies.

Admissions

Undergraduate 

Admission to the University of Miami is highly competitive and ranked as the most selective and competitive of all of Florida's 171 universities and colleges. For the Class of 2025 (enrolled fall 2021), UMiami received 42,244 applications and accepted 12,036 (28.5%). Of those accepted, 2,766 enrolled, a yield rate (the percentage of accepted students who choose to attend the university) of 23.0%. 

The enrolled first-year class of 2025 had the following standardized test scores: the middle 50% range (25th percentile-75th percentile) of SAT scores was 1310-1450, while the middle 50% range of ACT scores was 30-33.

The University of Miami attracts students from around the world and nation. As of 2019, 23 percent of University of Miami undergraduates were from the Miami metropolitan area, 10 percent were from other parts of Florida, 51 percent were from other U.S. states, and 15 percent were international students. Among graduate students, 42 percent were from the Greater Miami area, 11 percent were from other parts of Florida, 28 percent were from other U.S. states, and 19 percent were international students. As of November 2020, the University of Miami ranks eleventh nationally in combined diversity across racial, geographic, gender and age factors.

UMiami's freshman retention rate is 93%, with 84% going on to graduate within six years. As of 2015, the university reported that 73 percent of undergraduates graduated within four years, 82 percent graduated within five years, and 84 percent graduated within six years. Male student athletes and female student athletes have graduation rates of 56 percent and 67 percent, respectively, within six years.

Organization
The University of Miami is managed by a board of trustees that includes 48 elected members, three alumni representatives, 23 senior members, four national members, six ex officio members, 14 emeriti members, and one student representative. Ex officio members, who serve by virtue of their positions in the university, include the university's current president, the president and immediate past president of the university's citizens board, and the president, president-elect, and immediate past president of the university's alumni association. Since 1982, the board has developed eleven visiting committees, which include both trustees and outside experts to assist in overseeing the university's 12 academic units.

As of 2015, University of Miami president Julio Frenk, who also serves as the university's chief executive officer, was paid $1.14 million annually. Each of the University of Miami's 12 schools and colleges within the university is managed by a dean.

Undergraduate and graduate
College of Arts and Sciences
College of Engineering
Frost School of Music
Herbert Business School
Rosenstiel School of Marine and Atmospheric Science
School of Architecture
School of Communication
School of Education and Human Development
School of Nursing and Health Studies
Graduate only
Leonard M. Miller School of Medicine
The Graduate School
University of Miami School of Law

The University of Miami's also maintains a division of continuing and international education and an executive education program in the Herbert Business School.

Under a partnership with nearby Florida International University, students from both schools are permitted to take graduate classes at either university, affording graduate students at both universities a wider range of course selections.

The University of Miami's startup ecosystem, called The Launch Pad, assists entrepreneurial University of Miami students of all majors in obtaining assistance in starting, building, and scaling their own business. The program offers startup and business law-related legal assistance for student businesses in coordination with the University of Miami School of Law. The University of Miami also maintains an angel investor network, called Cane Angel Network, that allows university-affiliated investors to fund entrepreneurs with ties to the university.

In addition to its medical degree program, the University of Miami's Miller School of Medicine offers separate PhD and combined MD/PhD degrees in several biomedical sciences. The University of Miami's Department of Community Service, staffed by volunteer medical students and physicians from the medical school, provide free medical and other community services in Miami and surrounding communities.

Attendance costs

For the 2022–2023 academic year, the University of Miami reports that the estimated total annual cost of attendance for full-time undergraduate students residing on campus is $78,640; the estimated total annual cost of attendance for full-time undergraduate students residing in University Village or off-campus is $83,260; and the estimated total annual cost of attendance for full-time undergraduate students residing with parents or relatives is $69,160.

Rankings
In its 2022 edition of "America's Best Colleges," U.S. News & World Report ranks the University of Miami 55th among all national universities. Also in 2022, U.S. News ranks the Leonard M. Miller School of Medicine the nation's 43rd best medical school. In its "2023 Best Law Schools" report, U.S. News ranks the School of Law the nation's 73rd best law school, down from 72nd best in 2022.

In 2022, the Academic Ranking of World Universities ranked the University of Miami the ninth best university in the world for oceanography and the 25th best university in the world for business administration.

In 2018, U.S. News & World Report ranked the University of Miami Physical Therapy Department the nation's tenth best physical therapy program and its Department of Psychology Clinical Training Program the nation's 25th best for psychology.

Research

The University of Miami is classified among "Doctoral Universities: Very High Research Activity" and ranks 71st among all U.S. universities in research and sponsored programs expenditures, which totaled $375 million in 2021. 

In addition to research conducted in its individual academic schools and departments, the University of Miami maintains several university-wide research centers, including:
Abess Center for Ecosystem Science and Policy seeks to bridge the gap between science and environmental policy.
Center for Research and Education for Aging and Technology Enhancement (CREATE) explores strategies to improve the quality of life for older adults.
Computational Science Center is a data center that conducts data-driven research to identify solutions to various world problems and challenges.
European Union Center, a designated European Union Center for Excellence, is a consortium between the University of Miami and Florida International University established in 2001 with a European Commission grant to promote and research economic, social, and political issues of interest to the European Union.
Institute for Cuban and Cuban-American Studies (ICCAS) provides academic and cultural research and insight on Cuba.
John P. Hussman Institute for Human Genomics researches causes of Parkinson's disease, Alzheimer's disease, macular degeneration, and other diseases and explores human genome and other possible cures and treatments for them.
The Sue and Leonard Miller Center for Contemporary Judaic Studies provides objective, in-depth exploration of issues and trends that have affected the Jewish people over the last century.
The Wallace H. Coulter Center focuses on turning translational research in biomedical science and engineering into products that address unmet clinical needs and have market potential in the healthcare and biomedical industries.

The University of Miami's Miller School of Medicine receives more than $200 million annually in external grants and contracts to fund 1,500 ongoing projects. University of Miami's Interdisciplinary Stem Cell Institute researches the biology of stem cells and translates basic research into new regenerative therapies.

The University of Miami houses one of the nation's largest centralized academic cyber infrastructures. In 2007, the university launched the Center for Computational Science High Performance Computing group. Since then, the group has grown from a zero HPC cyberinfrastructure to a regional high-performance computing environment that currently supports more than 1,200 users, 220 TFlops of computational power, and more than three petabytes of disk storage.

As of 2008, the University of Miami's Rosenstiel School of Marine and Atmospheric Science receives $50 million in annual external research funding. Their laboratories include a saltwater wave tank, a five tank conditioning and spawning system, a multi-tank Aplysia culture laboratory, controlled corals climate tanks, and DNA profiling equipment. The campus also houses an invertebrate museum with 400,000 specimens. The University of Miami operates the Bimini Biological Field Station in Bimini district in the western Bahamas, an array of oceanographic high-frequency radar along the East Coast of the United States, and a Bermuda-based aerosol observatory. The university owns Little Salt Spring, a National Register of Historic Places site, in North Port, Florida where the Rosenstiel School performs archaeological and paleontological research.

In 2010, the University of Miami built a brain imaging annex to the James M. Cox, Jr. Science Center within the College of Arts and Sciences, which includes a functional magnetic imaging (fMRI) system and a laboratory where scientists, clinicians, and engineers study fundamental aspects of brain function. Construction of the lab was funded in part by a $14.8 million stimulus grant from the National Institutes of Health (NIH).

In 2016, the University of Miami received $195 million in federal research funding, including $131.3 million from the U.S. Department of Health and Human Services and $14.1 million from the National Science Foundation. The University of Miami's Leonard M. Miller School of Medicine received a record $149.5 million in NIH funding in 2019, making the Miller School of Medicine the world's 39th largest NIH grant recipient institution and largest NIH grant recipient of any medical school in Florida. 

Also in 2016, the university received $161 million in science and engineering funding from the U.S. federal government, making the university the largest Hispanic-serving recipient and 56th-largest recipient of federal science and engineering funding. Within the $161 million in funding, $117 million was granted by the U.S. Department of Health and Human Services the university's school of medicine.

Student life

 
The University of Miami is affiliated with 31 social fraternities and sororities. Seven of them (Alpha Epsilon Pi, Alpha Sigma Phi, Lambda Chi Alpha, Pi Kappa Phi, Sigma Alpha Epsilon, Sigma Chi, and Zeta Beta Tau) have houses on campus. Others have suites, including Beta Theta Pi, Kappa Sigma, Sigma Alpha Mu, and Sigma Phi Epsilon. Multicultural fraternities and sororities include six of the nine historically African-American organizations (collectively known as the Divine Nine), Latino, and Asian-interest fraternities and sororities.

As of 2022, the University of Miami has 356 student organizations, including Amnesty International, Habitat for Humanity, the Ibis yearbook, UMTV (an award-winning cable television channel with nine programs broadcast on Comcast Channel 96), UniMiami (a Spanish cable television broadcast), the student-run Distraction Magazine, and the campus radio station WVUM, which has broadcast to the Miami metropolitan media market continuously since 1967. Since 1929, students have published The Miami Hurricane, which is currently published weekly and has been named to the Associated Collegiate Press Hall of Fame.

The University of Miami has several selective and prestigious student honor societies. Founded in 1926, Iron Arrow Honor Society (which also considers select faculty, staff, and alumni for induction) is the highest honor awarded by the university. The university maintains a chapter of Mortar Board. In 1959, Order of Omega was founded at the University of Miami and then ultimately blossomed into a national honor society in addition to maintaining its ongoing founding chapter at the University of Miami. It is now a national honorary for fraternity and sorority members with its founding chapter continuing at the University of Miami.

The university has appointed individuals in various departments, called "troubleshooters", to address student problems and complaints, and it employs an ombudsman to mediate complaints that go unresolved by these troubleshooters. Since 1986, the university operates under an enforceable honor code that governs student conduct.

Athletics

 

The University of Miami's athletic teams are the Miami Hurricanes and are widely referred to as "The 'Canes" or "The U." The Hurricanes are members of NCAA Division I, the highest level of athletics sanctioned by the National Collegiate Athletic Association (NCAA), and compete primarily in the Atlantic Coast Conference (ACC). Prior to joining the ACC in 2004, the University of Miami competed in the Big East Conference. The Hurricanes maintain seven NCAA men's athletics teams (baseball, basketball, cross-country, diving, football, tennis, and track and field) and ten women's teams (basketball, cross-country, diving, golf, rowing, soccer, swimming, tennis, track and field, and volleyball).

The University of Miami's mascot, first introduced in 1957, is Sebastian the Ibis. The university's 179-member marching band, established in 1933, is Band of the Hour.

Football

The University of Miami football team has won five national championships (1983, 1987, 1989, 1991, and 2001) and has appeared in the AP Top 25 frequently since the 1980s. University of Miami football alumni include nine members of the Pro Football Hall of Fame, two Heisman Trophy winners, and dozens of players who have gone on to NFL careers. As of 2022, at least one University of Miami football player has been selected in the NFL Draft in 48 consecutive NFL drafts, dating back to 1975. Among all colleges and universities, as of 2022, the University of Miami holds all-time records for most defensive linemen (49) and is tied with USC for most wide receivers (40) to go on to play at the NFL level.

Beginning in the 1980s with the arrival of former head coach Howard Schnellenberger, the University of Miami football program blossomed quickly and unpredictably into one of the nation's most high profile and elite college football programs and began developing what now is one of the sport's largest and most passionate global fan bases. Since then, it also has developed several of the most famed, flamboyant, and successful players at the NFL level and also, along the way, been subjected to vast scrutiny and some criticism during its rise to national prominence, which featured three national championships in the 1980s followed by scandal-related damage to its recruiting capabilities, a subsequent comeback leading to its 2001 national championship, yet a second scandal-plagued descent, and, most recently, a second comeback that now has the program on solid footing again recognized as a national college football force (ranked in the top 25 nationally as the 2022 season began). 

Much of the program's dramatic history from the 1980s is captured in a widely-viewed December 12, 2009, ESPN documentary, The U, which drew 2.3 million viewers, then making it the most watched documentary in ESPN history. A 2014 sequel, The U Part 2, picked up where The U left off, covering the University of Miami as it launched a comeback from these 1980s scandals leading up to its 2001 national championship team (widely considered one of the best, and possibly the best team, in college football history) followed by yet a second series of widespread scandals that cost scholarships and inflicted multi-year damage on the program's competitiveness.

On December 7, 2021, Mario Cristobal, a former University of Miami college football player and University of Oregon head coach, was hired as the University of Miami's new head football coach and provided a ten-year, $80 million contract.

The Hurricanes play their home games at Hard Rock Stadium in Miami Gardens. In 2007, the university signed a 25-year contract for the team to play at Hard Rock Stadium through 2033. Prior to moving to Hard Rock Stadium, from 1937 through 2007, the Hurricanes played their home football games at the Miami Orange Bowl in Little Havana. Ater 60 years as one of professional and collegiate football's most famed stadiums, the Miami Orange Bowl was demolished in 2008.

Baseball

Like its football program, the University of Miami baseball team has proven one of the most successful in the nation over the past four decades, winning four national championships (1982, 1985, 1999, and 2001). Multiple Miami Hurricanes baseball players have gone on to professional careers in Major League Baseball.

The Hurricanes' baseball team plays their home games at Alex Rodriguez Park at Mark Light Field, an on-campus baseball stadium named for New York Yankees third baseman Alex Rodriguez who contributed $3.9 million toward the stadium's renovation.

The team is coached currently by Gino DiMare, and its baseball-only mascot, introduced in 1982, is the Miami Maniac.

Men's and women's basketball

The University of Miami's men's basketball team has been coached since 2011 by Jim Larrañaga. The Hurricanes' men's basketball team has reached the NCAA Championship's "Sweet 16" three times (1999–2000, 2012–2013, and 2021–2022). In the 2021–2022 season, the team reached the "Elite 8" for the first time in school history. Several Miami Hurricanes men's basketball players have gone on to NBA careers. The  University of Miami's women's basketball team has been coached since 2005 by Katie Meier, and several of its players have gone on to WNBA professional careers.

Both basketball teams play their home games at Watsco Center, an 8,000-capacity indoor stadium on the University of Miami campus.

Men's and women's tennis
The University of Miami's tennis program has produced several players who have gone on to amateur and professional accomplishment, including Israel team player Maya Tahan, Wimbledon Singles champion Rod Mandelstam, Pan American Games Doubles gold medal winner Ronni Reis, NCCA Women's Singles champion Audra Cohen, Wimbledon Doubles champion Doris Hart, three-time NCAA Singles champion Pancho Segura, and former professional tennis players Monique Albuquerque, Julia Cohen, Gardnar Mulloy, Ed Rubinoff, Michael Russell, Jodi Appelbaum-Steinbauer, and Todd Widom.

Other sports

The University of Miami women's soccer team and both its men's and women's track and field teams host their home meets in Cobb Stadium, which opened in 1999 on San Amaro Drive on the University of Miami campus.

People

Notable alumni

Since its 1925 founding, several notable University of Miami alumni have gone on to vast globally-recognized accomplishment, influence, and notoriety in their respective fields. Among them are former Honduran president Porfirio Lobo Sosa, former Peruvian president Fernando Belaúnde, former Belize prime minister Dean Barrow, former Iceland prime minister Bjarni Benediktsson, economist and former Bahamas Central Bank governor Wendy Craigg, former Peruvian vice president and minister Mercedes Aráoz, Pulitzer Prize-winning poet and writing professor Donald Justice, actor Dwayne "The Rock" Johnson, Grammy Award-winning musicians Gloria Estefan, Bruce Hornsby, Enrique Iglesias, Jaco Pastorius, and Jon Secada, chief executive officers of various companies, public officials, heads of governmental agencies, scientists, academics, media personalities, authors and writers, and multiple professional athletes in Major League Baseball, the NBA, and the NFL, including nine NFL Pro Football Hall of Fame inductees.

Notable faculty

University of Miami faculty include, or have included, a number of notable academics, including four Nobel Prize recipients and globally-recognized experts across nearly every academic discipline. Among them are physicist Paul Dirac, biochemists Robert F. Furchgott and Earl Wilbur Sutherland Jr., writers Paul Holdengräber and Juan Ramón Jiménez, former U.S. ambassador to the United Nations Peter Burleigh, sinologist Edward L. Dreyer, international affairs expert Leon Gouré, historians Mary Lindemann and Joan R. Piggott, economist Neil Wallace, finance and business management expert Henrik Cronqvist, former U.S. Secretary of Health and Services Donna Shalala, healthcare policy and management expert John Quelch, international business expert Yadong Luo, audio engineer Bill Porter, artist and architect Bonnie Seeman, architect Elizabeth Plater-Zyberk, sociologist Lowell Juilliard Carr, constitutional law expert John Hart Ely, administrative law expert Paul R. Verkuil, musicians Jaco Pastorius and Pat Metheny, artist Walter Darby Bannard, philosopher Colin McGinn, and others.

Notes

References

External links

University of Miami athletics website

 
1925 establishments in Florida
Coral Gables, Florida
Educational institutions established in 1925
Education in Miami
Private universities and colleges in Florida
Universities and colleges accredited by the Southern Association of Colleges and Schools
Universities and colleges in Miami-Dade County, Florida